Alappuzha West is a village in Alappuzha district in the state of Kerala, India. It is part of Alappuzha municipality.

References

Villages in Alappuzha district